The pistachio (Pistacia vera), a member of the cashew family, is a small tree originating from an area that includes Afghanistan, Central Asia, and Iran. The tree produces seeds that are widely consumed as food.

Etymology
Pistachio is from late Middle English pistace, from Old French, superseded in the 16th century by forms from Italian pistacchio, via Latin from Greek  pistákion, and from Middle Persian pistakē.

History

The pistachio tree is native to regions of Central Asia, including present-day Iran and Afghanistan. Archaeology shows that pistachio seeds were a common food as early as 6750 BCE. The earliest evidence of pistachio consumption goes back to the Bronze Age Central Asia and comes from Djarkutan, modern Uzbekistan.

Pistachio trees were introduced from Asia to Europe in the first century AD by the Romans. They are cultivated across Southern Europe and North Africa.

Theophrastus described it as a terebinth-like tree with almond-like nuts from Bactria.

It appears in Dioscorides' writings as pistákia (πιστάκια), recognizable as P. vera by its comparison to pine nuts.

Pliny the Elder wrote in his Natural History that pistacia, "well known among us", was one of the trees unique to Syria, and that the seed was introduced into Italy by the Roman proconsul in Syria, Lucius Vitellius the Elder (in office in 35 AD) and into Hispania at the same time by Flaccus Pompeius.

The early sixth-century manuscript De observatione ciborum (On the Observance of Foods) by Anthimus implies that pistacia remained well known in Europe in late antiquity.

An article on pistachio tree cultivation was brought down in Ibn al-'Awwam's 12th-century agricultural work, Book on Agriculture.

Archaeologists have found evidence from excavations at Jarmo in northeastern Iraq for the consumption of Atlantic pistachio.

The Hanging Gardens of Babylon were said to have contained pistachio trees during the reign of King Marduk-apla-iddina II about 700 BCE.

In the 19th century, the pistachio was cultivated commercially in parts of the English-speaking world, such as Australia and in the US in New Mexico and California, where it was introduced in 1854 as a garden tree.

In 1904 and 1905, David Fairchild of the United States Department of Agriculture introduced hardier cultivars to California collected from China, but it was not promoted as a commercial crop until 1929. Walter T. Swingle's pistachios from Syria had already fruited well at Niles, California, by 1917.

In 1969 and 1971, changes to the tax code in the United States eliminated tax shelters for almonds and citrus fruits. That encouraged California farmers to plant pistachio trees, because they were still eligible for such tax breaks. In 1972, the Shah of Iran began a school breakfast program that included packets of pistachios. This resulted in a decline of pistachio exports from Iran, resulting in increased prices in other countries and additional incentives to plant pistachio trees in California. The first commercial pistachio harvest in California took place in 1976. The Shah was forced into exile in January, 1979 during the Iranian Revolution, resulting in an end to trade between the United States, providing additional incentives for American farmers to plant dramatically more pistachio trees.

By 2008, U.S. pistachio production rivaled that of Iran. Drought and unusually cold weather in Iran led to severe declines in production there, while U.S. production was increasing. At that time, pistachios were Iran's #2 export product, after the oil and gas sector.

By 2020, there were 150,000 pistachio farmers in Iran, approximately 70% of whom were small-scale producers using inefficient manual picking and processing techniques. There were 950 far larger U.S. producers, using highly efficient mechanized  production techniques. Between them, the U.S. and Iran control 70% of the world export market, with the U.S. in the lead. Worldwide demand exceeds production, so both countries have the ability to sell their production to various export markets.

In 2021, Fresno County, California accounted for about 40% of U.S. pistachio production,  with a value of $722 million.

Botany

Habitat
Pistachio is a desert plant and is highly tolerant of saline soil. It has been reported to grow well when irrigated with water having 3,000–4,000 ppm of soluble salts. They need a sunny position and well-drained soil. Pistachio trees do poorly in conditions of high humidity and are susceptible to root rot in winter if they get too much water and the soil is not sufficiently free-draining. Long, hot summers are required for proper ripening of the fruit.

Characteristics
The plants are dioecious, with separate male and female trees. The flowers are apetalous and unisexual and borne in panicles.

The fruit is a drupe, containing an elongated seed, which is the edible portion. The seed, commonly thought of as a nut, is a culinary nut, not a botanical nut. The fruit has a hard, cream-colored exterior shell. The seed has a mauve-colored skin and light green flesh, with a distinctive flavor. When the fruit ripens, the shell changes from green to an autumnal yellow/red and abruptly splits partly open. This is known as dehiscence, and happens with an audible pop. The splitting open is a trait that has been selected by humans. Commercial cultivars vary in how consistently they split open.

Cultivation
The pistachio tree  may live up to 300 years. The trees are planted in orchards, and take around 7 to 10 years to reach significant production. Production is alternate-bearing or biennial-bearing, meaning the harvest is heavier in alternate years. Peak production is reached around 20 years. Trees are usually pruned to size to make the harvest easier. One male tree produces enough pollen for 8 to 12 drupe-bearing females. Harvesting in the United States and in Greece is often accomplished using equipment to shake the drupes off the tree. After hulling and drying, pistachios are sorted according to open-mouth and closed-mouth shells, then roasted or processed by special machines to produce pistachio kernels.

In California, almost all female pistachio trees are the 'Kerman' cultivar, from Kerman, Iran. A scion from a mature female 'Kerman' is grafted onto a one-year-old rootstock.

Diseases and environment

Pistachio trees are vulnerable to numerous diseases and infestation by insects such as Leptoglossus clypealis in North America. Among these is infection by the fungus Botryosphaeria, which causes panicle and shoot blight (symptoms include death of the flowers and young shoots), and can damage entire pistachio orchards. In 2004, the rapidly growing pistachio industry in California was threatened by panicle and shoot blight first discovered in 1984. In 2011, anthracnose fungus caused a sudden 50% loss in the Australian pistachio harvest. Several years of severe drought in Iran around 2008 to 2015 caused significant declines in production.

Production

Secondary producers were Iran, China, and Syria.

A 2020 report indicated that nearly half of the global production of pistachios in 2019 came from the United States, with production in Iran falling to as low as 7% due to US trade sanctions against Iran, climate change, and weak economic and water management in Iran. Efforts to grow pistachios for international markets were made during 2019 in Georgia and adjacent Caucasus countries. More organic production is being promoted in Spain.

Consumption

The kernels are often eaten whole, either fresh or roasted and salted, and are also used in pistachio ice cream, kulfi, spumoni, pistachio butter, pistachio paste, and confections such as baklava, pistachio chocolate, pistachio halva, pistachio lokum or biscotti, and cold cuts such as mortadella. Americans make pistachio salad, which includes fresh pistachios or pistachio pudding, whipped cream, and canned fruit.

The shell of the pistachio is naturally a beige color, but it may be dyed red or green in commercial pistachios. Originally, dye was applied to hide stains on the shells caused when the nuts were picked by hand. In the 21st century, most pistachios are harvested by machine and the shells remain unstained.

Nutrition

Raw pistachios are 4% water, 45% fat, 28% carbohydrates, and 20% protein (table). In a 100-gram reference amount, pistachios provide  of food energy and are a rich source (20% or more of the Daily Value or DV) of protein, dietary fiber, several dietary minerals, and the B vitamins thiamin (76% DV) and vitamin B6 (131% DV) (table). Pistachios are a moderate source (10–19% DV) of calcium, riboflavin, vitamin B5, folate, vitamin E, and vitamin K (table).

The fat profile of raw pistachios consists of saturated fats, monounsaturated fats and polyunsaturated fats. Saturated fatty acids include palmitic acid (10% of total) and stearic acid (2%). Oleic acid is the most common monounsaturated fatty acid (51% of total fat) and linoleic acid, a polyunsaturated fatty acid, is 31% of total fat. Relative to other tree nuts, pistachios have a lower amount of fat and food energy but higher amounts of potassium, vitamin K, γ-tocopherol, and certain phytochemicals such as carotenoids, and phytosterols.

Research and health effects

Although a typical serving of pistachios supplies substantial food energy (nutrition table), their consumption in normal amounts is not associated with weight gain or obesity.

One review found that pistachio consumption lowered blood pressure in persons without diabetes mellitus. A 2021 review found that pistachio consumption for three months or less significantly reduced triglyceride levels.

Toxin and safety concerns
As with other tree seeds, aflatoxin is found in poorly harvested or processed pistachios. Aflatoxins are potent carcinogenic chemicals produced by molds such as Aspergillus flavus and A. parasiticus. The mold contamination may occur from soil, poor storage, and spread by pests. High levels of mold growth typically appear as gray to black filament-like growth. Eating mold-infected and aflatoxin-contaminated pistachios is unsafe. Aflatoxin contamination is a frequent risk, particularly in warmer and humid environments. Food contaminated with aflatoxins has been found as the cause of frequent outbreaks of acute illnesses in parts of the world. In some cases, such as Kenya, this has led to several deaths.

Pistachio shells typically split naturally prior to harvest, with a hull covering the intact seeds. The hull protects the kernel from invasion by molds and insects, but this hull protection can be damaged in the orchard by poor orchard management practices, by birds, or after harvest, which makes exposure to contamination much easier. Some pistachios undergo so-called "early split", wherein both the hull and the shell split. Damage or early splits can lead to aflatoxin contamination. In some cases, a harvest may be treated to keep contamination below strict food safety thresholds; in other cases, an entire batch of pistachios must be destroyed because of aflatoxin contamination.

Like other members of the family Anacardiaceae (which includes poison ivy, sumac, mango, and cashew), pistachios contain urushiol, an irritant that can cause allergic reactions.

See also
 List of culinary nuts
 Pistacia lentiscus

References

External links

 

Pistacia
Edible nuts and seeds

Flora of Central Asia
Flora of Western Asia
Fruit trees
Trees of Mediterranean climate
Italian cuisine
Plants described in 1753
Drupes
Symbols of California